Armando Robles Godoy (February 7, 1923 – August 10, 2010) was a Peruvian film director. He was son of the Peruvian composer Daniel Alomía Robles and Carmela Godoy. His 1967 film En la selva no hay estrellas won the Golden Prize at the 5th Moscow International Film Festival in 1967. In 1971 he was a member of the jury at the 7th Moscow International Film Festival. Director of Espejismo, so far the only Peruvian film to have been nominated to a Golden Globe award.

Works 
 Veinte casas en el cielo
 El amor está cansado
 La muralla verde y otras historias
 Un hombre flaco bajo la lluvia
 12 cuentos de soledad
 El Cementerio De Los Elefantes

Selected filmography 
 Ganarás el pan (1964)
 En la selva no hay estrellas (No Stars in the Jungle,1967)
 La muralla verde  (The Green Wall, 1970)
 Espejismo (Mirage, 1972)
 Sonata Soledad (1978)
 Imposible Amor (2003; first Peruvian feature film shot in digital)

See also 
 List of Peruvian submissions for the Academy Award for Best Foreign Language Film

References

External links

1923 births
2010 deaths
Peruvian film directors
Armando
National University of San Marcos alumni
Peruvian expatriates in the United States